DC Pride is an annual LGBTQIA+ themed comic book anthology first published by DC Comics in June 2021. The second anthology was published in June 2022. The third anthology is scheduled for release in May 2023.

Publication and promotion
DC Pride was first announced on March 11, 2021 as an 80-page anthology comic focusing on DC Comics' various LGBT characters, to be published in June as a celebration of Pride Month. The anthology is also meant to celebrate the LGBT creators working at DC, with the anthology's writers and artists being members of the LGBT community.

As part of their celebration of Pride Month, DC also announced the limited series Crush & Lobo, focusing on the mercenary Lobo and his lesbian daughter Crush; June would also see the release of the graphic novel Poison Ivy: Thorns. DC Pride also marks the first instance of Nia Nal / Dreamer appearing in comics, with the story written by Nicole Maines. The character first appeared in the live-action series Supergirl, played by Maines. Maines described herself as very excited at getting the opportunity to write the character.

A second anthology, DC Pride 2022, was announced in March 2022; it was released in June 2022. DC Comics stated that it is a "100+ page Prestige format annual anthology comic".

In March 2023, DC Comics announced three titles for Pride Month: DC Pride 2023 #1, DC Pride: Through the Years #1, and The DC Book of Pride. DC Pride 2023 #1 is the annual 100+ page prestige format anthology scheduled for release in May 2023. DC Pride: Through the Years #1 is a reprint "collection of three older DC comics that featured LGBTQ+ characters" scheduled for release in June 2023. The DC Book of Pride, by Jadzia Axelrod, is a character guidebook on the 50+ LGBTQ+ DC characters scheduled for release on May 16, 2023.

Content

2021 
DC Pride was released on June 8, 2021 and consisted of the following stories:
 "The Wrong Side of the Looking Glass" (James Tynion IV, writer; Trung Le Nguyen, artist; Aditya Bidikar, letterer): focuses on lesbian superheroine Kate Kane / Batwoman.
 "He's the Light of My Life!" (Sam Johns, writer; Klaus Janson, artist; Dave McCaig, colorist; Tom Napolitano, letterer): focuses on Alan Scott / Green Lantern—who has recently come out as gay—and his gay son Todd Rice / Obsidian.
 "By the Victors" (Steve Orlando, writer; Stephen Byrne, artist; Josh Reed, letterer): focuses on gay superheroes Midnighter and Extraño.
 "Clothes Makeup Gift" (Danny Lore, writer; Lisa Sterle, artist; Enrica Eren Angiolini, colorist; Becca Carey, letterer): focuses on the non-binary Flash Jess Chambers and their relationship with Andy Curry, daughter of Aquaman and Mera.
 "Try the Girl" (Vita Ayala, writer; Skylar Patridge, artist; José Villarrubia, colorist; Ariana Maher, letterer): focuses on lesbian superheroine Renee Montoya.
 "Be Gay, Do Crimes" (Sina Grace, writer; Ro Stein and Ted Brandt, artists; Aditya Bidikar, letterer): focuses on former supervillain and ally of Wally West, Hartley Rathaway / Pied Piper and his musical face-off against Drummer Boy.
 "Another Word for a Truck to Move Your Furniture" (Mariko Tamaki, writer; Amy Reeder, artist; Marissa Louise, colorist; Ariana Maher, letterer): focuses on the relationship between bisexual villainesses Harleen Quinzel / Harley Quinn and Dr. Pamela Isley / Poison Ivy.
 "Date Night" (Nicole Maines, writer; Rachael Stott, artist; Enrica Eren Angiolini, colorist; Steve Wands, letterer): focuses on trans woman Nia Nal / Dreamer, whose first appearance was in the live-action series Supergirl, where she is played by Maines.
 "Love Life" (Andrew Wheeler, writer; Luciano Vecchio, artist; Rain Beredo, colorist; Becca Carey, letterer): Jackson Hyde / Aqualad and his date Syl must defend Pride parade from Eclipso, with help from the Justice League Queer.

2022 
DC Pride 2022 was released on June 14, 2022 and featured a foreword from Nicole Maines. The anthology consisted of the following stories:

 "Super Pride" (Devin Grayson, Nick Robles, Triona Farrell and Aditya Bidikar): Jon Kent/Superman, a bisexual man, as he, his boyfriend Jay Nakamura and best friend Damian Wayne attend Metropolis Pride and Jon begins to embrace his identity and status as a symbol for both the people of Earth and the LGBT+ community.
 "Confessions" (Stephanie Williams, Meghan Hetrick, Marissa Louise, and Ariana Maher): Queen Nubia reveals to her partner Io, a blacksmith, that the sword she made for her was destroyed in a wrestling match with Giganta rather than in an epic battle. 
 "Special Delivery" (Travis Moore, Enrica Eren Angiolini, and Ariana Maher): Newly out hero Tim Drake races to meet up with his new boyfriend Bernard so that they can attend their first Pride together despite being distracted by local criminals.
 "Are You Ready for This?" (Danny Lore & Ivan Cohen, Brittney Williams, Enrica Eren Angiolini, and Ariana Maher): Non-binary Earth-11 speedster Jess Chambers (Kid Quick) tries to prove themself as a hero.
 "A World Kept Just For Me" (Alyssa Wong, W. Scott Forbes, and Ariana Maher): Jackson Hyde/Aquaman struggles to be open with his new boyfriend about his childhood in New Mexico.
 "The Gumshoe in Green" (Tini Howard, Evan Cagle, and Lucas Gattoni): Jo Mullein/Green Lantern investigates a suspicious couple on an alien planet in this neo-noir thriller.
 "Think of Me" (Ted Brandt & Ro Stein and Frank Cvetkovic): Connor Hawke battles Music Meister while trying to write a letter to his mother explaining his asexuality.
 "Public Display of the Electromagnetic Spectrum" (Greg Lockard, Giulio Macaione, and Aditya Bidikar): The Ray struggles to publicly express his affection towards his boyfriend Xenos.
 "The Hunt" (Dani Fernandez, Zoe Thorogood, Jeremy Lawson, and Aditya Bidikar): Harley Quinn and Poison Ivy face a mysterious foe.
 "Bat's in the Cradle" (Stephanie Philips, Samantha Dodge, Marissa Louise, and Lucas Gattoni): Jacob Kane reflects upon his relationship with his daughter Kate.
 "Up at Bat" (Jadzia Axelrod, Lynne Yoshii, Tamra Bonvillain, and Ariana Maher): Alysia Yeoh is forced into a fight with Killer Moth when a wounded Barbara Gordon approaches her for help.
 "Finding Batman" (Kevin Conroy with art by J. Bone and Aditya Bidikar): An autobiographical story where Conroy describes how his portrayal of Batman drew from his painful experiences as a gay man.

2023 
DC Pride 2023 #1, scheduled for release on May 30, 2023, will consist of the following stories:

 A Multiversity story by Grant Morrison and Hayden Sherman
 A Tim Drake and Connor Hawke story by Nadia Shammas and Bruka Jones
 A Circuit Breaker and the Flash of Earth-11 story by A.L. Kaplan
 A Midnighter, Apollo and Alan Scott Green Lantern story by Josh Trujillo and Don Aguillo
 A Ghost-Maker and Catman vs. Cannon and Saber story by Rex Ogle and Stephen Sadowski
 A Jon Kent and John Constantine story by Christopher Cantwell and Skylar Patridge
 A Natasha Irons and Nubia story by Mildred Louis
 A Harley Quinn, Poison Ivy, and Crush story by Leah Williams and Paulina Ganucheau
 A preview of an upcoming Dreamer story by Nicole Maines and Rye Hickman

DC Pride: Through the Years #1, scheduled for release on June 13, 2023, will contain:

 "The Flash #53 by William Messner-Loebs and Greg LaRocque, in which the Pied Piper comes out to the Flash".
 "Detective Comics #854, by Greg Rucka and J.H. Williams, which launched Batwoman on her solo series".
 "Supergirl #19, by Steve Orlando, Vita Ayala, and Jamal Campbell, in which nonbinary teen Lee Serrano becomes friends with Supergirl".
 An original story, by Tim Sheridan and Cian Tormey, "about Green Lantern Alan Scott, which will lay the groundwork for that character's next storyline".

Reception
Upon release, DC Pride #1 received widespread acclaim from comics critics. At the review aggregator website Comic Book Roundup, which assigns a weighted mean rating out of 10 to reviews from comics critics, the series received an average score of 9.2 based on 17 reviews. Oliver Sava, for The A.V. Club, wrote: "corporate offerings celebrating Pride Month often feel like disingenuous attempts to cash in on a social movement, but DC Pride #1 succeeds by showcasing the ways DC Comics has been pushing LGBTQ+ representation for years. [...] Many of the stories in DC Pride feel like the start of something more, and ideally there's enough interest in this one-shot that these heroes can spend more than a month in the spotlight". Sava compared this issue to Marvel Voices Pride and called Marvel's issue "more of a mixed bag". Sava wrote that "while Marvel has dragged its feet in regards to meaningful LGBTQ+ representation in film and television, DC has spent the last decade expanding representation across all of its media".

References

2021 in comics
Comics anthologies
DC Comics one-shots
LGBT-related comics
2020s LGBT literature